José Maldonado (1874 – 1932), a.k.a. "Aguila Blanca" (White Eagle), was a Puerto Rican revolutionary who fought with the Cuban Liberation Army and whose controversial exploits in Puerto Rico have contributed to making him part of Puerto Rican lore.

Early years
Maldonado (birth name: José Maldonado Román) was born in the town of Juana Díaz when Puerto Rico was still a Spanish colony. During this era, the economic situation for the common laborer was a difficult one. Most of the land was owned by wealthy landlords, loyal to the Spanish Crown, who at times were cruel and did not provide any type of medical or basic rights to their workers. Maldonado was incarcerated at the age of 11 and he began to resent the established authorities of the time. He later became known among his friends either as Don "Pepe" or by the nicknames "Aguila Blanca" (White Eagle) and "Aguila Azul" (Blue Eagle).

Folk-hero
Maldonado committed various criminal acts which made him an outlaw in the eyes of the Spanish authorities. According to La Democracia a local political newspaper at the time, Maldonado was accused of robbery twice and sent to prison in 1887 and again in 1889. From 1890 to 1891, he was briefly incarcerated for aggravated assault. Maldonado, who operated in the areas of Juana Díaz and Ponce, continued his assault and robbing spree. He was captured and sent to jail once more in 1896. Even though his acts were considered criminal by the authorities, he gained the admiration of the common Jibaro (humble farmer) who viewed his acts as being against the rich and powerful, and against the Spanish Crown which they considered oppressive.

Revolutionary

On March 24, 1897, Maldonado, joined Fidel Vélez and his men at Susúa Alta, just outside Yauco. Vélez, a Puerto Rican revolutionary, and his men unfurled the Puerto Rican flag for the first time on Puerto Rican soil and marched towards the town of Yauco. In the insurrection against Spanish rule which became known as the "Intentona de Yauco", they planned to attack the barracks of the Spanish Civil Guard with the aim of gaining control of the Guards arms and ammunition which were stored there.

The plan did not succeed because when the rebels arrived they were ambushed by the Spanish forces who had set up positions and were waiting for them. A firefight ensued upon the arrival of the group and the rebels quickly retreated. On March 26, another group headed by José Nicolás Quiñones Torres and Ramón Torres attempted to fight the Spaniards in a barrio called "Quebradas" of Yauco, however said revolt, the last against Spanish rule in Puerto Rico, also failed. Over 150 rebels were arrested, accused of various crimes against the state and sent to prison in the City of Ponce.

 Maldonado escaped and hid in a sugar cane field. While in hiding, he shot a person known as Emilio, who betrayed him and threatened to tell the authorities of his whereabouts. Maldonado then met with fellow rebel Abelardo Moscoso and went into exile in New York City where he met with the Cuban Revolutionary Committee and joined the Cuban Liberation Army. Maldonado fought in Cuba against the Spaniards and was wounded.

After his return to Puerto Rico, Maldonado and his men continued to harass the Spanish Civil Guard. According to Edwin A. Emerson, Jr., an American spy pretending to be a German journalist, in a story published by Century Magazine in September 1898, he (Emerson) met "Águila Blanca" with the help of a local. Emerson was trying to make his way back to a ship which would take him away from Puerto Rico when he realized that an attack on San Juan by the United States was sure to occur. Emerson stated that he came upon Don "Pepe," as Maldonado was also known, and six of his men. Maldonado and his men, who were armed with machetes and rifles, asked Emerson what were his plans to which Emerson replied that he would like to reach the coast. Two Spanish soldiers arrived and Emerson, together with Don "Pepe" and his men, chased after them. After the chase, the insurgents asked Emerson when will the Americans come to help liberate them from the Spaniards, to which Emerson answered "very soon."

After the Spanish–American War Puerto Rico was annexed by the United States under the terms of the Treaty of Paris of 1898, ratified on December 10, 1898. The United States established a military government and appointed Major General Nelson A. Miles, the first head of the military government, established on the island, acting as both head of the army of occupation and administrator of civil affairs. Many Puerto Ricans, among them Maldonado, believed that Puerto Rico would gain its independence however, almost immediately, the United States began the "Americanization" process of Puerto Rico. The U.S. occupation brought about a total change in Puerto Rico's economy and polity and did not apply democratic principles to the colony. Puerto Rico was classified as an "unincorporated territory" which meant that the protections of the United States Constitution did not automatically apply because the island belonged to the U.S., but was not part of the U.S. In 1899, the New York Times published a description of Puerto Ricans as "uneducated, simple-minded and harmless people who were only interested in wine, women, music and dancing" and recommended that Spanish should be abolished in the island's schools and only English should be taught. Schools became the primary vehicle of Americanization, and initially all classes were taught in English, which also made for a large dropout rate.

Maldonado and his men continued to harass the wealthy plantation owners with the exception that now he also harassed the American military authorities. On August 16, 1898, Major General Guy Vernon Henry sent a message from Utuado to General Miles in Ponce, telling him that the "White Eagle" and his men were operating in the area of Jayuya and that he needed reinforcements to pursue them. On December 18, General John Rutter Brooke received a telegraph, at the United States Army General Headquarters in San Juan, stating that "White Eagle" and his men set fire to a plantation in the town of Juana Díaz and that they were headed towards San Juan.

On December 26, 1898, Maldonado wrote a letter to Eugenio Deschamps, the editor of the newspaper Correo de Puerto Rico requesting that he be pardoned and in which he explained his situation and why he acted against the authorities. He went on trial and with the help and testimony of Deschamps was exonerated against all the charges against him. A crowd of admirers gathered at Plaza Las Delicias in Ponce and received the news of Maldonado's exoneration with cheers.

The United States considered anyone to oppose their rule and authority in the island to be an Anti-American and as such labeled Maldonado a bandit. In 1905, the editor of the Our Islands and Their People, a U.S. based publication, published the photo, which was taken during the Intentona de Yauco of 1897, where Fidel Vélez and Maldonado unfurled the Puerto Rican flag, under the title of "White Eagle and his band of Outlaws".

Later years
In March 1899, Maldonado was involved in a fight in the City of Ponce and was arrested. His men tried in vain to liberate him and the incident erupted into an armed confrontation between Maldonado's men and the local authorities in which Maldonado lost the sight from one of his eyes from the wounds received.  Maldonado received support from the local press and was exonerated from all wrongdoing. He later married Juana Estrada and became a professional barber. According to his granddaughter Margarita Maldonado Colón, Maldonado was a generous man with the less fortunate and he was often visited by the president of the Puerto Rican Nationalist Party, Pedro Albizu Campos.

In the later years of his life (until 1930), Maldonado worked as a government employee.  In his book War Against All Puerto Ricans, Denis states that Maldonado owned a barber shop which he named Salón Boricua and which was located at 351 Calle Colton (Colton Street), Esquina Barbosa (at the corner of Barbosa Street) in Barrio Obrero. The word Boricua is synonymous with Puerto Rican and is a self-referential term which Puerto Ricans commonly employ. The word is derived from the word Borinquen (the name which the native Taínos gave to the island before the arrival of the Spanish Conquistadors). And that among his employees was Vidal Santiago Díaz who in 1932, purchased the barbershop from Maldonado.

Maldonado died January 17, 1932, due to throat cancer in his home in Toa Baja. Regarding his death, Denis states that Maldonado was treated for throat cancer at the Presbyterian Hospital in San Juan and that Maldonado died of the illness in 1932 in said hospital, which has been disputed.

Legacy
Puerto Rican folksinger Roy Brown wrote and dedicated to Maldonado a song titled "Águila Blanca." Ángel Pacheco Alvarado, a folk singer from Peñuelas, Puerto Rico honored Maldonado's memory with a song composed of three verses of which the first one is the following:

See also

List of Puerto Ricans
Intentona de Yauco
Puerto Rican Campaign

Notes

References

Further reading
"Aguila"; by: Reynaldo Marcos Padua; Publisher: Ediciones Huracan; 1ST edition (January 2008); 

1874 births
1932 deaths
People from Juana Díaz, Puerto Rico
Puerto Rican criminals
Puerto Rican nationalists
Puerto Rican folklore
Puerto Rican independence activists